Acrapex carnea is a species of moth of the family Noctuidae first described by George Hampson in 1905. It is found in Africa, including South Africa.

The wingspan is 28–30 mm.

Description
Head and thorax brown slightly mixed with ochreous; thorax ochreous tinged with rufous; pectus, legs, and abdomen ochreous suffused with brown. Forewing ochreous tinged with rufous; a brown streak on median nervure except at base; slight black streaks in and beyond lower angle of cell and a point at upper angle; a whitish fascia in terminal half of cell and thence obliquely curved to apex; traces of an oblique postmedial series of dark points on veins 4 to 1; a brown shade from termen below apex with very slight dark streaks on its inner edge above and below vein 5; traces of a terminal series of black points; cilia white tinged with brown and with faint brown line at middle. Hindwing whitish suffused with brown, paler at base; cilia white tinged with brown and with faint brown line near base; the underside whitish suffused with fuscous brown.

References

External links

 

Xyleninae
Insects of Lesotho
Moths of Africa
Moths described in 1905